Gardenia mutabilis is a species of plant in the family Rubiaceae native to the Philippines and Sulawesi.

References

mutabilis